Sadin Smajović (born 10 May 1995) is a Serbian footballer.

Career

Tallying one goal in sixteen league appearances as well as participating in the cup for Singapore S.League side Balestier Khalsa in 2016, Smajovic joined FK Josanica, a team based in Novi Pazar, in early 2017 following his release from Balestier Khalsa.

Balestier Khalsa posted fallacious information about the Serbian forward upon his departure, writing that he made six cup appearances when he had actually made eight.

References

Serbian footballers
Living people
Association football forwards
Association football wingers
Association football midfielders
Expatriate footballers in Singapore
Singapore Premier League players
1995 births
FK Javor Ivanjica players
Balestier Khalsa FC players